Gene A. Carpenter (November 28, 1939 – December 10, 2009) was an American football coach.  He served as the head football coach at Adams State College—now known as Adams State University in 1968 and at Millersville University of Pennsylvania from 1970 to 2001, compiling a career college football coaching record of 220–90–6.  Carpenter was inducted in the College Football Hall of Fame in 2012.

Coaching career
Carpenter was the tenth head football coach at Adams State College in Alamosa, Colorado and he held that position for the 1968 season.  
His coaching record at Adams State was 8–1. In the one season as head coach, his team outscored opponents by 225 to 115.  The only loss was a 28–6 defeat by New Mexico Highlands on October 5, 1968 on their way to becoming the Rocky Mountain Athletic Conference champions.

Carpenter was an assistant football coach the University of Utah for one season, in 1969, before being hired as head football coach at Millersville State College—now known as Millersville University of Pennsylvania—in January 1970.

Head coaching record

See also
 List of college football coaches with 200 wins

References

External links
 

1939 births
2009 deaths
Adams State Grizzlies football coaches
Huron Screaming Eagles football players
Millersville Marauders athletic directors
Millersville Marauders football coaches
Utah Utes football coaches
College Football Hall of Fame inductees
Adams State University alumni
University of Utah alumni
People from Cornwall, Pennsylvania
Players of American football from Pennsylvania